The Bunkhouse Vol. 1: Anchor Black Tattoo is the fourth studio album by the Irish folk musician and singer-songwriter Fionn Regan, released on 7 September 2012 on Universal Music.

Recording
The Bunkhouse Vol.I: Anchor Black Tattoo was recorded at Regan's home studio using a four-track recorder and a single microphone. Regan noted, "I did quite a bit of touring on my own earlier this year supporting Feist and although the rooms were big, I felt very much at home on the stage and after that I had a strong instinct to get right down to the brass tacks, back to the essence of what is it that I do as a songwriter, so that’s what I’ve done."

Composition
Regarding the album's aesthetic, Regan stated, "You can call it folk, but I feel in a lot of ways it’s like an Irish punk album, in that it’s pure, it's stripped down, it goes against the status quo and it was made with just what I have at my disposal. Recording in this way also allowed me to work very quickly, I was documenting as I was writing, so these songs feel very fresh to me, straight out of the ground, which is a really great feeling."

Track listing

Personnel
All personnel credits adapted from The Bunkhouse Vol. 1: Anchor Black Tattoos liner notes.

Performer
Fionn Regan – vocals, guitar, producer, mixing, artwork

Technical personnel
Rob Ferrier – mixing
Aidan Foley – mastering

Chart positions

References

2012 albums
Fionn Regan albums
Universal Music Group albums